R.S.V.P. is a 2002 American dark comedy suspense film written and directed by Mark Anthony Galluzzo. The film features Glenn Quinn of Roseanne and Angel fame in his final role.

Plot 
During a post-graduation party of a college student obsessed with serial killers, the guests are murdered one by one.

Cast
 James M. Churchman as The Quick Brown Fox (as Jim Churchman)
 Sharon Bruneau as Female Victim
 Scott Workman as Male Victim
 A. Scott as Agent Hanna
 C.B. Allen as Officer Gaunt
 Rich Kelly as Detective Thomas
 Glenn Quinn as Prof. Hal Evans, phd.
 Rick Otto as Nick 'The Prick' Collier
 Lucas Babin as Jimmy Franklin
 Brandi Andres as Jordan
 Reno Wilson as Garrett
 Jeanne Chinn as Cricket
 Bruce Michael Paine as Bartender
 Jason Mewes as Terry
 Daniel Joseph as John Skyles
 Jonathan Banks as Walter Franklin
 Grace Zabriskie as Mary Franklin
 Nora Zehetner as Leigh Franklin
 Majandra Delfino as Callie
 Tommy Hoe as Uncle Atticus, MD.
 Fernando Quevedo as Xavier
 Lindsay Truxell as Sexy Motorist

Genre 

The film was marketed as a dark comedy. The Austin Chronicle described it as a suspense film.

Production 
Funding came from investors whose deal fell through on Mark Anthony Galluzzo's previous film. Galluzzo, who wrote, produced, and directed the film, said he performed many roles during production both out of necessity and because of his background working various jobs on other projects.

Reception 
Rotten Tomatoes, a review aggregator, reports that 20% of five surveyed critics gave the film a positive review; the average rating is 4.2/10. Scott Foundas of Variety called it a "loud, crass redo of Hitchcock's Rope" with unlikable characters. Kimberley Jones wrote in The Austin Chronicle that R.S.V.P.s "inability to stick to a tone makes for a wildly uneven film, but also a mostly entertaining one, too".

R.S.V.P. won best film at the Malibu Film Festival.

References

External links
 
 

2002 films
2000s thriller films
2002 black comedy films
American black comedy films
American comedy thriller films
2002 comedy films
2000s English-language films
2000s American films